Azaran or Azeran or Azran (Persian: آذَران) may refer to:

Places
Azaran, Isfahan, Iran
Eziran, or Azrān, Isfahan Province, Iran
Azaran, Mazandaran, Iran
Hashtrud, also known as Āz̄arān, East Azerbaijan Province, Iran

Other uses
 Azaran, a fictional country in TV series The Andromeda Breakthrough
 The Azran Civilisation in Professor Layton and the Azran Legacy

See also